Nasser Ahmed Al Meer (Arabic: ناصر احمد علي born 19 August 1987 ) a Qatari beach volleyball player, the captain of the Qatar men's national beach volleyball team, and a silver medalist of the ANOC World Beach Games 2019. He represents Al-Arabi SC.

Sports career 
Naser began his sports career with Al-Wakrah SC. He has participated in several Arab, Asian and European championships as well as training camps between 2002 and 2021. In 2018, he moved to Al-Khor SC. He won a silver medal at the 20109 ANOC World Games.

National and international participation 

 Katara Beach Volleyball Cup (2018)
 Asian Beach Volleyball Spectacle (2018)
 ANOC World Beach Games (2019)
 Aspire Beach Volleyball Cup
 Doha Beach Volleyball Cup (2021)

Achievements 

 Silver medal in ANOC World Games Championship: 2019
 Qatar Cup: 2019
 Emir Cup: 2019

Clubs 

  Al-Arabi SC
  Al-Khor SC
  Al-Wakrah SC

References

External links 

 Nasser Ahmed Al Meer

Living people
Qatari men's volleyball players
Men's beach volleyball players
1987 births